The Aurangabad Lok Sabha constituency is one of the 40 Lok Sabha (parliamentary) constituencies in Bihar state in eastern India.

Assembly segments
Presently, Aurangabad Lok Sabha constituency comprises the following six Vidhan Sabha (legislative assembly) segments:

Members of Parliament

The following is the list of the Members of Parliament elected from this constituency, the first Member of Parliament from the constituency was eminent freedom fighter Shri Satyendra Narain Singh.

^ by poll

Election results

General elections 2019

General elections 2014

General Elections 2009

See also
 Aurangabad district
 List of Constituencies of the Lok Sabha

References

External links
Aurangabad lok sabha constituency election 2019 date and schedule

Lok Sabha constituencies in Bihar
Politics of Aurangabad district, Bihar
Politics of Gaya district